Saint-Lizier is a commune in the Ariège department in southwestern France, situated on the river Salat.

History
Saint-Lizier has a rich history stretching back to pre Gallo-Roman times. In 72 BC, Pompey, returning from his triumphs in Spain against Sertorius, stopped here. He gathered together the ancient tribes of the area under the name Consorani. The ramparts seen today date from 3rd century AD and enclose the oppidum.

During the fifth century the citadel became an episcopal see, the oldest in the Ariège area. Its first bishop is thought to have been Saint Valier. The town is named in honor of its 6th Century bishop Lycerius, canonized as Saint Lizier, a bishop who participated in the Council of Agde in 506. The town has two former cathedrals: Saint-Lizier Cathedral (now the parish church) and Notre-Dame-de-la-Sède Cathedral.

Population
Inhabitants of Saint-Lizier are called Licérois.

See also
Communes of the Ariège department

References

Communes of Ariège (department)
Plus Beaux Villages de France
World Heritage Sites in France
Ariège communes articles needing translation from French Wikipedia